Higham Priory was a priory in Kent, England likely founded in 1148. It was officially dissolved on 28 September  1524.

References

Monasteries in Kent